5, 6, 7, 8 – Bullenstaat! [5, 6, 7, 8 – Cop state!] is an album by German rock band Die Ärzte, originally only sold at concerts. Now the album is available as a digital download for free on Die Ärzte's website. There are also songs from 1, 2, 3, 4 – Bullenstaat! as bonus tracks.

Track listing

Personnel 
Farin Urlaub: guitar, vocals
Bela B: drums, vocals
Rodrigo González: bass guitar, vocals

External links 
Official site – bonus-downloads page (album is available for downloading there)

References

2001 EPs
Die Ärzte EPs